The Lisbon Theatre and Film School (Escola Superior de Teatro e Cinema) of the Polytechnic Institute of Lisbon
inherited the function of the National Conservatoire, founded by Almeida Garrett, in 1836, and of teaching Film, introduced in the same establishment since 1971. The main goal of the Lisbon Theatre and Film School is training in the fields of Theatre and Cinema. Sometimes it is still referred to by its former designation "Conservatório Nacional". It is a public institution of higher education created in Lisbon but now located in Amadora, Portugal.

History

The Lisbon Theatre and Film School was set up in Lisbon by Decree-Law nr. 310/83, dated July 1 (1983). The object of this legal document was to reconvert the National Conservatoire (Conservatório Nacional), the establishment of artistic education, and the setting up of several new establishments offering degrees in the same artistic areas as the Conservatório, among which this school, specifically directed at theatre and film education.

Theatre Education had a long tradition in the National Conservatoire: it went back to the date of its creation in 1836, by Decree of Queen Maria II, in the scope of a Plan for the foundation and organisation of a National Theatre proposed by João Baptista de Almeida Garrett, then still called Conservatório Geral de Arte Dramática and formed by three Schools: Escola Dramática ou de Declamação for drama education, Escola de Música for music education (integrating the former Conservatório de Música, set up in Casa Pia by Decree of 1835) and Escola de Dança, Mímica e Ginástica Especial for dance, mime arts and especial gymnastics education.

By later reforms, the name of the CNational Conservatoire was changed, first to Conservatório Real de Lisboa and then, already under the new republican regime, to Conservatório Nacional, the name of the Escola Dramática ou de Declamação being altered to Escola de Arte de Representar.

On July 4, 1914, the School of Art of Acting (Escola de Arte de Representar) was for the first time granted management autonomy.

By Decree dated May 19, 1914, the scenography and setting design degree was set up in this school (to be taught “in the big paintings room of the National Theatre Almeida Garrett which, functioning under the Escola de Arte de Representar”, would exclusively “be at the service andpractices of the corresponding teacher”); by Decree of August 6, 1914, the costume designer degree was also set up.

As for Film Education, the corresponding degree was only set up in National Conservatoire after 1971, on a pedagogic experimental basis, in the scope of the reform process undertaken by Madalena Perdigão, in the time of Minister Veiga Simão.

By that time, the Pilot School for the Formation of Film Professionals (Escola Piloto para a Formação de Profissionais de Cinema) was created and its first degree initiated in 1973. From the beginning, a deep concern of this school has been to complement the technical knowledge necessary to cinema-linked professions with a more artistic component.

The degree being offered today by the Department of Film of the Lisbon Theatre and Film School has gone through an evolution since 1973 but its philosophy is still the same as that of the first degree which, it should be stressed, was very much of a pioneer in Portuguese public higher education.

By governmental Decree nr. 46/85, of November 22 (1985), the Lisbon Theatre and Film School - that had so far been under the Directorate General of Higher Education (Direcção-Geral do Ensino Superior) and, since 1983, managed by an Organisation Committee formed by Professors Jorge Synek Listopad, President, and José Bogalheiro, member – was integrated in the Polytechnic Institute of Lisbon (IPL), a public polytechnic higher education establishment created by Decree-Law nr. 513-T/79, of December 26 (1979).

The Lisbon Theatre and Film School became then an organic unit of the Polytechnic Institute of Lisbon, still in a process of internal organisation by the mentioned Committee until the publication of its Statutes in Journal of Laws (Diário da República), 2nd series, nr. 15, of January 18, 1995.

When totally new premises were built in Amadora, within the greater Lisbon area, for the Lisbon Theatre and Film School(the first building ever constructed in Portugal specifically to host a public artistic higher education establishment), it was finally possible to move from the old Caetanos' Convent (Convento dos Caetanos), in Lisbon, where Almeida Garrett´s Conservatório Geral de Arte Dramática had provisionally functioned, to modern premises designed to have adequate teaching rooms, studios, performing areas, library and cafeteria, all of which offer the best working conditions for its students.

The bi-departmental structure of the School, a historical heritage from the previous schools of Theatre and of Film of the National Conservatoire, led to a certain pedagogic-scientific autonomy granted to the two Departments, according to the Statutes.

The Lisbon Theatre and Film School has steadily been asserting itself as a reference school both at national and international level, and it has been integrated in relevant international organisations dealing not only with the specific areas concerned, like the International Theatre Institute (ITI), the CILECT – Centre International de Liaison des Écoles de Cinema et de Telévision, but also with Arts in general, which is the case of ELIA – European League of Institutes of the Arts.

This international cooperation concern also led to efforts made to strengthen the School´s active participation in teacher and student intercourse programmes, within specific programmes, like the Socrates/Erasmus and the Leonardo da Vinci, as well as bilateral agreements with Universities of Latin America (Brazil, Argentina, Mexico).

The objectives of the Lisbon Theatre and Film School, according to its Statutes, are: Training of highly qualified professionals; research activities; artistic experiments and production; launching or participation in development projects; community involvement.

To consistently fulfil these objectives, the School has adjusted its educational provision to the Bologne Process, its two Departments offering first and second level Degrees (Graduation and Master); it set up a Research Centre which is developing projects in partnership with a similar Centre in University of Algarve; it participates in educational development programmes at local level, as for instance the programme for curriculum improvement activities in public basic schools in the Amadora municipality, and annually produces and organises, in its own premises as well as in Theatres, Museums, Cinemas and other public spaces, numbers of performances and exhibitions of its students´ dramatic and cinema practical works, attendance to all events being free to the community.

Courses
Graduation in Theatre: Acting, Set & Costume Design, Production Management.
Graduation in Cinema: Screenwriting, Production, Direction, Cinematography, Sound, Editing.
Master in Theatre: Performative Arts (Writing for the Stage, Acting, Theatre of Movement, Theatre-Music), Set & Costume Design, Directing, Production Management, Theatre & Community.
 Master in Film Project Development: Dramaturgy and Directing, Cinematic Narrative, Post-Production Technology.

The Students
Among students who have studied at the Lisbon Theatre and Film School are name like:

Theatre
 Alexandra Lencastre
 André e. Teodósio
 Catarina Wallenstein
 Diogo Infante
 Elmano Sancho
 Eunice Muñoz
 Hana Sofia Lopes
 Joana de Verona
 Nuno Lopes
 Rita Blanco
 Ruy de Carvalho
 Sílvia Alberto
 Teresa Tavares

Film
 David Fonseca
 Edgar Pêra
 Joaquim Leitão
 Joaquim Sapinho
 João Botelho
 João Pedro Rodrigues
 João Salaviza
 Manuel Mozos
 Manuela Viegas
 Marco Martins
 Miguel Gomes
 Pedro Costa
 Rui Reininho
 Vítor Gonçalves
 Susana de Sousa Dias

Teaching Staff

Among the teachers who taught at the Lisbon Theatre and Film School are name like:

Theatre
 Anna Paula
 António Casimiro
 Glória de Matos
 Guilherme Filipe
 João Mota
 Jorge Listopad
 José Carlos Barros
 José Peixoto
 Margarida de Abreu
 Mário Barradas
 Rogério de Carvalho
 Rui Mendes

Film 
In the past:
 António Reis
 Alberto Seixas Santos
 Paulo Rocha
 Fernando Lopes

In the present:
 Vítor Gonçalves
 Joaquim Sapinho
 Manuela Viegas

The Presidents / Directors 
As Lisbon Theatre and Film School (Escola Superior de Teatro e Cinema):
 2012-... - António Lagarto
 2011 - Carlos J. Pessoa
 2007-2010 - Filipe Oliveira 
 2004-2006 - Paulo Morais Alexandre 
 2001-2003 - Daniel del-Negro 
 1998-2000 - João Mota 
 1995-1997 - Filipe Oliveira (Conselho Diretivo)
 1983-1995 - Jorge Listopad and José Bogalheiro

As Conservatoire (Conservatório):
 1978-1983 - Luís Casanovas, Viegas Tavares and Luís Oliveira Nunes 
 1972-1978 - Lúcio Mendes
 1938-1971 - Manuel Ivo Cruz
 1930-1937 - Júlio Dantas
 1918-1938 - Vianna da Motta
 1898-1917 - Eduardo Schwalbach Lucci
 1878-1898 - Luís Augusto Palmeirim
 1870-1878 - Duarte de Sá
 1848-1869 - Joaquim Pedro Quintela
 1842-1848 - António Pereira dos Reis and José Trasimundo Mascarenhas Barreto
 1841-1842 - Joaquim Larcher
 1836-1841 - Almeida Garrett

Management Bodies
(2012-2014)
President - António Lagarto
Director of the Department of Theatre - Álvaro Correia
Director of the Department of Film - José Bogalheiro
President of Technical & Scientific Council - João Maria Mendes
President of the Pedagogical Council - Francisco Salgado
President of the Council of Representatives - Filipe Oliveira

International relations
The Lisbon Theatre and Film School is affiliated to:
 the ITI - International Theatre Institute / UNESCO Chair,
 the ELIA – European League of Institutes of the Arts
 the CILECT – Centre International de Liaison des Écoles de Cinéma et Télévision.

References

External links
IMDb

Polytechnics in Portugal
Theatre in Portugal
Film schools in Portugal
Drama schools
Buildings and structures in Lisbon District